Tower280 at Midtown, formerly known as Midtown Tower, is a high-rise building in downtown Rochester, NY. It contains luxury apartments as well as a top floor penthouse with office space and retail space and a restaurant on the bottom three levels.

History
Midtown Tower was first constructed in 1962 as part of the now defunct Midtown Plaza shopping center before the mall's closing and subsequent demolition. While part of Midtown Plaza it was home to a seventy eight room hotel, offices and the Top of the Plaza restaurant and nightclub which was known early on for its Jazz scene and notable performing acts such as Buddy Rich, Dizzy Gillespie, Count Basie and Sarah Vaughn. As the mall began its decline the hotel closed in 1980 with the restaurant after a few format changes closing for good in 2000.

As Midtown Plaza was torn down to make way for the later-cancelled PAETEC Headquarters, the steel structure of Midtown Tower was saved and ultimately retrofitted with a more modern façade. The tower now houses residential units as well as retail and office space on the bottom three levels. By October 2016, the tower's residential spaces were nearly rented out with some retail space still available.

Notable Tenants
Bergmann Associates
Branca Italian Restaurant
Brand Networks

Gallery

See also
List of tallest buildings in Rochester, New York

External links
Official Website
Midtown Rising

References

Skyscraper office buildings in Rochester, New York
Mixed-use developments in New York (state)
1962 establishments in New York (state)
Residential buildings completed in 1962
Residential skyscrapers in Rochester, New York